NGC 1187 is a barred spiral galaxy located about 60 million light-years away in the constellation of Eridanus. It was discovered on December 9, 1784 by the astronomer William Herschel.

NGC 1187 has hosted two supernova explosions since the 1980s. In October 1982, the first supernova seen in NGC 1187 — SN 1982R, a type I, was discovered at La Silla Observatory and, in 2007, the amateur astronomer Berto Monard in South Africa spotted another supernova in this galaxy — SN 2007Y, a type Ib/c.

Gallery

References

External links 
 

Eridanus (constellation)
1187
Barred spiral galaxies
UGCA objects
011479